The Battle of Paso Ipohy was an action planned by the Paraguayans that consisted of a surprise attack on a Brazilian camp near Humaitá, near the Tebicuary River in Paraguay, on December 25, 1867. The attack resulted in the victory of the outnumbered Paraguayans.

The Battle 

A Brazilian camp for Volunteers of the Fatherland was deployed near the Tebicuary River in Paso Ipohy in Paraguay. Francisco Solano López realized that he could take a heavy blow to Brazilian troops there, as the surrounding region consisted of swamps and puddles that could facilitate a surprise action. Valois Rivarola, chosen by Mariscal to plan the attack, selected Captain Eduardo Vera and 150 of his best men for the task. Armed only with sabers and machetes, Vera's troops silently approached the Brazilian tents and attacked, taking them completely by surprise, and inflicting about 400 casualties without losing a single man. Soon the Brazilians recovered from this attack and began to pursue the Paraguayans across the lagoons and swamps. The better equipped among them reached some Paraguayans and shot them down with rifles, but were repelled by hidden Paraguayan artillery, as they moved too far from their base.

Everyone who participated in the attack was rewarded by López, who gave 20 pesos to the soldiers and 40 pesos to the officers. Eduardo Vera was promoted to Major and Rivarola was congratulated for the plan.

References 

Battles involving Paraguay
Battles of the Paraguayan War
Battles involving Brazil
December 1867 events
Conflicts in 1867
History of Ñeembucú Department